Jennifer "Jen" Gould (born March 10, 1971) is a Canadian actress.

She won the 2008 Juno Award for Children's Album of the Year for Music Soup.  She is also known for her role as Hotaru Tomoe, and her alter ego Sailor Saturn, in the Cloverway dub of the third season of Sailor Moon as well as PallaPalla in the fourth season of the dub.

Biography
Gould is a native of Montreal, but grew up in Ottawa. She got her start in acting when her father, Robert Gould took her to an audition for Ottawa's Orpheus Operatic Society, and they were given roles as townsfolk in the play The Music Man. She would go on to attend York University, where she took theatre courses from 1990 to 1994, earning a Bachelor of Fine Arts degree. During five seasons at the Stratford Shakespeare Festival, she took on such roles as Esmeralda in The Hunchback of Notre Dame and the title character in Gigi.

From 2010 to 2013 she attended George Brown College, receiving a diploma for graphic design. She now works as a graphic designer for Rogers Enterprises.

Personal life
Gould is married to Hayes Steinberg they have two children.

Filmography

Film

Television

Video games

References

External links
 
 
 

1971 births
Living people
Actresses from Montreal
Anglophone Quebec people
Canadian children's musicians
Canadian film actresses
Canadian stage actresses
Canadian television actresses
Canadian voice actresses
Juno Award for Children's Album of the Year winners
Singers from Montreal
20th-century Canadian actresses
21st-century Canadian actresses
21st-century Canadian women singers